The following lists events that have happened in 1861 in the Qajar dynasty.

Incumbents
 Monarch: Naser al-Din Shah Qajar

Event
 Mozaffar ad-Din Shah Qajar was named as crown prince. He was also appointed as governor of Azerbaijan and sent to Tabriz.

References

 
Iran
Years of the 19th century in Iran
1860s in Iran
Iran